CollabNet VersionOne  is a software firm headquartered in Alpharetta, Georgia, United States. CollabNet VersionOne products and services belong to the industry categories of value stream management, devops, agile management, application lifecycle management (ALM), and enterprise version control. These products are used by companies and government organizations to reduce the time it takes to create and release software.

About 
The company was founded to improve the methods of software creation and delivery. Today devops is extending to the application of value stream management practices.

This is a business-to-business software company. The company's customers are global enterprises and government organizations that use the products to apply a cohesive approach to software development and management throughout application development life-cycles.

The company's customers are in diverse industries such as finance, healthcare, government, high-tech, and others in 100 countries. CollabNet VersionOne partners are composed of other technology providers that enable certain product capabilities and extend the coverage of products, as well sales and delivery partners. The company also teams with #YesWeCode, a Dream Corps initiative designed to bring free technology training and industry connections to 100,000 young people in communities of color and increase local talent for the technology industry.

The company also offers training and education in its categories, from Scrum certifications and Agile training to value stream management. Many trainings and certifications are open to the public, requiring no experience with the company's products. It is widely understood in the software industry that Scrum and Agile are foundational for modern software development teams.

History 
The company was originally founded as CollabNet in 1999 by Tim O’Reilly, Brian Behlendorf, and Bill Portelli, who also served as the company's chief executive officer. The founding mission was to create software that helps organizations manage and improve software development processes and make them more efficient while producing higher quality software. Vector Capital became a major investor of the company in 2014. 

In May 2015, Flint Brenton became president and chief executive officer with Portelli remaining on the board of directors. The company remains privately owned.

CollabNet merged with VersionOne in 2017, becoming CollabNet VersionOne, and began expanding its enterprise value stream management endeavors.

TPG Capital acquired CollabNet VersionOne from Vector Capital, announcing investments in the company up to $500 million over the next years.

Previous additions include the 2010 acquisition of Danube Technologies, a company specializing in Agile/Scrum management software tools (including ScrumWorks Pro) and consulting and training services for organizations implementing Agile. CollabNet also acquired Codesion in 2010. Codesion specialized in cloud development.

The company has historically focused on innovating on its own and through partnerships, from early ALM, to solutions for government use, to the cloud, to DevOps and Value Stream Management.

In January 2020, CollabNet VersionOne (CollabNet) and XebiaLabs announced that the two companies had merged. In April of that year, Arxan joined, the merger of the three companies being known by the name Digital.ai.

Products 
The company offers several products for agile management, devops, value stream management, application lifecycle management (ALM), and enterprise version control. The company's major products include VersionOne, Continuum, TeamForge, TeamForge SCM, and VS.

See also 

Agile software development
Continuous Integration
Continuous delivery
DevOps Toolchain
Scrum (software development)
Value Stream Mapping

References

External links 

 Value Stream Management Tools Forrester

Collaborative software
Software companies established in 1999
Free software companies
Software companies based in Georgia (U.S. state)
Companies based in Fulton County, Georgia
Software companies of the United States
1999 establishments in Georgia (U.S. state)